A military brat is a term used in several English-speaking countries to describe a person who spends their childhood or adolescence living with parents who are active members of the Armed Forces.

It may also refer to:
 Military brat (US subculture), the subculture, history & psychological studies of military brats in the United States

See also
 Military dependent